Pro Street is a style of street-legal custom car popular in the 1980s, usually built to imitate a Pro Stock class race car.  Pro Street cars should appear to be more at home on the drag strip than the street, while remaining street legal and not gutted like a Race Car or Bracket Race car. Typically called a Backhalf car (tubbed).

Cars of this type typically feature two of the following three modifications:
 A highly modified V8.
 A narrowed rear axle coupled with oversized rear wheels & at least a 14" wide x 5+” sidewalls tire (located within the wheelwells) for maximum grip and wheelie bars
 A roll cage.

Other than the rear suspension and wheel wells, cars of this type often remain unmodified from the firewall back, keeping stock floorpans, a full interior with windshield wipers, carpet, and working lights.

See also
 Hot rod

Modified vehicles
DIY culture